Mingzhou or Ming Prefecture (738–1194) was a zhou (prefecture) in imperial China located in modern northeastern Zhejiang, China, around modern Ningbo. The prefecture was called Yuyao Commandery from 742 to 758.

Located on the coast of the East China Sea and the southern bank of Hangzhou Bay (which connects it to Hang Prefecture and the Grand Canal), Ming Prefecture was one of the most important international ports during the Tang (618–907), Wuyue (907–978) and Song (960–1279) dynasties. Cargo ships to and from Japan, Silla (57 BC – 935 AD), Goryeo (918–1392), and Liao (907–1125) frequented this prefecture. Ming Prefecture also administered Zhoushan, an island archipelago off the Zhejiang coast, including Zhoushan Island.

Counties
For most of its history, Ming Prefecture administered the following 4–6 counties (縣):

Before 764, Xiangshan (which is separated from the prefectural seat by Xiangshan Harbor) was under the administration of Tai Prefecture.

History

Tang dynasty
Ming Prefecture was created on 3 August 738 by splitting Mao County (鄮縣) from Yue Prefecture and dividing the area into 4 counties. Around 500 homeless people from Run Prefecture were brought over to resettle in Ming Prefecture.

In 739, it was determined that 207,032 people from 42,027 families resided in Ming Prefecture.

In 744, Mao County's magistrate Lu Nanjin (陸南金) had laborers expand the Wanjin Lake (now known as Dongqian Lake) to facilitate irrigation and agricultural water management.

In 744, while waiting for the typhoon to pass before embarking on his third journey to Japan, the Buddhist monk Jianzhen stayed at the Temple of King Ashoka.

In 752, three ships carrying Japanese diplomats from Empress Kōken's court arrived in Ming Prefecture.

In 762, Yuan Chao (袁晁) rebelled from the Zhoushan Archipelago, and quickly took several prefectures including Ming Prefecture. In 763, Yuan Chao was destroyed and captured by the Tang army led by Li Guangbi.

In 798, military officer Li Huang (栗鍠) rebelled in Ming Prefecture. He was defeated in 799.

In 804, a Japanese ship carrying 127 people from Emperor Kanmu's court arrived in Ming Prefecture, the Buddhist monk Saichō among them.

Prefects

Tang dynasty

Qin Changshun (秦昌舜), 738
Lü Yanzhi (呂延之), 758–759
Pei Jing (裴儆), 771–773
Cui Yin (崔殷), 773–?
Wang Mi (王密), 770s
Zhao Heng (趙恒)
Li Chang (李長), 770s
Wang Mu (王沐), 788–?
Ren Dong (任侗), 793–?
Han Cha (韓察), 821–823
Ying Biao (應彪), 823–?
Li Wenru (李文孺), 829–?
Yu Jiyou (于季友), 832–?
Zhang Cizong (張次宗), 840s
Li Jingfang (李敬方), 847–?
Yin Sengbian (殷僧辯)
Li Xiugu (李休古), 850s?
Li Kang (李伉), 865
Cui Qi (崔琪), 874–?
Zhong Jiwen (鍾季文), 881–892
Liu Wen (劉文), 880s?
Yang Zhuan (羊僎), 880s?
Huang Sheng (黄晟), 892–909

Wuyue

Qian Hua (錢鏵)
Shen Chengye (沈承業), 916–?
Qian Yuanqiu (錢元球), 916–?
Qian Yuanqu (錢元[𤣩瞿]), 924–926?
Qian Yuanxiang (錢元珦), ?–933
Yang Renquan, 933–?
Kan Fan (闞燔), 945–?
Qian Hongyi (錢弘億), 949–?
Qian Weizhi (錢惟治), 975–978

Song dynasty

Wang Su (王素), 980–981
Xu Xiufu (徐休復), 981–982
Zhao Yizhi (趙易知), 982–983
Xi Ping (席平), 983–984
Qian Xiangxian (錢象先), 984?–987?
Chen Jin (陳矜), 988–989
Sun Fu (孫扶), 989–990
Qiu Chongyuan (邱崇元), 990–992
Ling Jingyang (凌景陽), 990s
Chen Chong (陳充), 992–994
Hu Dan (胡旦), 994–995
Bao Dang (鮑當), 996–997
Xu Jizong (徐繼宗), 997–1000
Ding Gunian (丁顧年), 1000?
Wang Ying (王膺), 1008–1009
Su Qi (蘇耆), 1009–1011
Fan Feng (范諷), 1011–1013
Kang Xiaoji (康孝基), 1013–1015
Liu Chuo (劉綽), 1015–1017
Li Yigeng (李夷庚), 1017–1022
Yan Su (燕肅), 1022–1023
Lin Daishu (林殆庶), 1023–1024
Zeng Hui (曾會), 1024–1027
Liu Geng (劉賡), 1020s?/1030s?
Zhang Jiao (張交), 1032–1034
Xu Qi (徐起), 1035–1036
Li Zhao (李照), 1036–1037
Zhang Yan (張弇), 1037–1038
Li Zhi (李制), 1038–1040
Bao Yazhi (鮑亞之), 1040–1041
Qian Yannian (錢延年), 1042–1044
Lu Zhen (陸軫), 1044–1046
Wang Zhou (王周), 1040s
Fan Sidao (范思道), 1047–1049
Sun Gai (孫沔), 1051–1052
An Zhen (安稹)
Lü Changling (呂昌齡), 1053–1054
Shen Tong (沈同), 1055–1056
Qi Kuo (齊廓), 1056–1057
Bao Ke (鮑軻), 1057–1058
Qian Gongfu (錢公輔), 1058–1060
Lang Qi (郎玘)
Li Sidao (李思道), 1064–1065
Yu Changnian (俞昌年), 1065–1066
Shen Fu (沈扶), 1066–1067
Miao Zhen (苗振), 1060s?/1070s?
Wang Han (王罕), 1069–1071
Zhao Cheng (趙誠), 1072?–1073?
Li Yan (李綖), 1073–1074
Li Ding (李定), 1075–1078
Zeng Gong, 1078–1079
Wang Hui (王誨), 1082–1084
Ma Chong (馬珫), 1084–1085
Li Kang (李閌), 1080s?/1090s?
Li Cui (李萃), 1086–1087
Zhang Xiu (張修), 1080s?/1090s?
Han Zongdao (韓宗道), 1088–1089
Wang Fen (王汾), 1089
Wang Ziyuan (王子淵), 1089–1090
Liu Shu (劉淑), 1090–1091
Lü Wenqing (呂溫卿), 1091–1093
Liu Cheng (劉珵), 1093–1095
Yao Mian (姚勔), 1090s
Wang Zishao (王子韶), 1096–1097
Ye Tao (葉濤), 1097–1098
Wei Xiang (韋驤), 1098
Lu Chuan (陸傳)
Wang Zishen (王資深), 1102
Ye Di (葉棣)
Peng Xiu (彭休)
Bai Tong (白同)
Qian Jingfeng (錢景逢)
Song Kangnian (宋康年), 1109
Tan Zongdan (檀宗旦), 1110–1111
Cai Zhao (蔡肇), 1111
Li Tunan (李圖南), 1110s
Lü Zong (呂宗), 1110s
Zhou Zhi (周秩), 1114–1115
Zhou Bangyan, 1115
Mao You (毛友), 1116–1117
Lou Yi (樓异), 1117–1121?
Li Youwen (李友聞), 1121–1122
Jiang Yi (蔣彝), 1122
Jiang You (蔣猷), 1122–1123
Zhao Yi (趙億), 1123–1125
Wei Xian (魏憲), 1125–1126
Li Biru (李弼孺), 1126
Li Youwen (2nd appointment), 1126–1127
Su Xi (蘇攜), 1127–1128
Jin Shou (金受), 1128–1129
Shen Hui (沈晦), 1129–1130
Zhang Ruzhou (張汝舟), 1130
Liu Hongdao (劉洪道), 1130
Xiang Zimin (向子忞), 1130
Wu Mao (吳懋), 1130–1132
Chen Jian (陳戩), 1132
Lu Changmin (陸長民), 1132–1133
Li Chengzao (李承造), 1133
Guo Zhongxun (郭仲荀), 1133–1135
Qiu Yu (仇悆), 1135–1138
Zhou Gang (周綱), 1138–1139
Pan Lianggui (潘良貴), 1139–1140
Qiu Yu (2nd appointment), 1140–1141
Liang Rujia (梁汝嘉), 1141–1142
Mo Jiang (莫將), 1142–1145
Qin Di (秦棣), 1145–1147
Xu Chen (徐琛), 1147–1150
Cao Yong (曹泳), 1150–1152
Han Jin (韓璡), 1152–1153
Li Zhuang (李莊), 1153–1154
Wang Hui (王會), 1154–1155
Li Chong (李㳘), 1155
Fang Zi (方滋), 1155
Wang Yu (王俁), 1155–1156 
Jiang Shizhong (姜師仲), 1156–1158
Zhao Shanji (趙善繼), 1158–1159
Zhang Cheng (張偁), 1159–1160
Shen Gai (沈該), 1160–1162
Han Zhongtong (韓仲通), 1162–1163
Zhao Zisu (趙子潚), 1163–1164
Zhao Bogui (趙伯圭), 1164–1167
Zhang Jin (張津), 1167–1169
Zhao Bogui (2nd appointment), 1169–1174
Zhao Kai (趙愷), 1174–1180
Fan Chengda, 1180–1181
Zhao Yi (趙益), 1181
Xie Shiji (謝師稷), 1181–1182
Yang Xie (楊獬), 1182–1184
Zhao Shikui (趙師夔), 1184–1186
Geng Bing (耿秉), 1186
Yan Xi (延璽), 1186
Yue Fu (岳甫), 1186–1189
Lin Li (林栗), 1189–1190
Cheng Dachang (程大昌), 1190–1191
Lin Ji (林枅), 1191
Yu Chou (虞儔), 1191
Gao Kui (高夔), 1191–1193
Zhu Quan (朱佺), 1193–1194
He Dan (何澹), 1194–1195

References

 

Prefectures of Wuyue
Prefectures of the Tang dynasty
Liangzhe East Circuit
Former prefectures in Zhejiang
Ningbo
Zhoushan